Lasiococca is a plant genus of the family Euphorbiaceae first described in 1887. These are small to relatively large trees (up to 8 m high) found in scrubs or semi-evergreen forests. They grow in India, Indochina, Southeast Asia, and southern China.

Species
 Lasiococca brevipes (Merr.) Welzen & S.E.C.Sierra (syn L. malaccensis) - Peninsular Malaysia, Philippines, Lesser Sunda Islands, Sulawesi 
 Lasiococca chanii Thin - Vietnam
 Lasiococca comberi Haines - Hainan, Yunnan, Vietnam, Thailand, E India
 Lasiococca locii Thin - Vietnam
 Lasiococca symphylliifolia (Kurz) Hook.f. - Sikkim

References

Acalypheae
Euphorbiaceae genera